Akita-ken may refer to:
Akita Prefecture, Japan
Akita (dog)